Brave New World is the ninth album by American jazz group The Rippingtons, released in 1996 for the GRP label. The album reached No. 4 on Billboard's contemporary jazz chart. It was the group's final release on the GRP label.

Track listing
All songs written by Russ Freeman except as noted.
"Brave New World" - 4:14
"Urban Wanderer" - 4:41
"Key to the Forbidden City" - 4:46
"Hideaway" - 5:10
"Caravan of Love" (Ernie Isley, Marvin Isley, Chris Jasper) - 4:04
"Faith" - 4:32
"First Time I Saw Her" - 4:25
"Cicada" - 5:43
"While My Guitar Gently Weeps" (George Harrison) - 4:44
"Ain't No Stoppin' Us Now" (Gene McFadden, John Whitehead, Jerry Cohen) - 4:43
"Virtual Reality" - 5:06

Personnel 

The Rippingtons
 Russ Freeman – guitars, guitar synthesizer, keyboards
 David Kochanski – acoustic piano, acoustic piano solo (4)
 Kim Stone – electric bass, acoustic bass 
 Tony Morales – drums
 Steve Reid – percussion
 Jeff Kashiwa – alto saxophone, soprano saxophone, tenor saxophone, electronic wind instrument

Additional Musicians
 Eric Marienthal – saxophone (1, 3)
 Brandon Fields – saxophone (7, 11)
 Bill Reichenbach Jr. – trombone 
 Gary Grant – trumpet
 Jerry Hey – trumpet
 Magic Mendez – instruments (5, 10), musical arrangements (5, 10)

Vocals
 Phil Perry – lead vocals (5)
 Wallace "Scotty" Scott – lead vocals (5, 10)
 Walter Scott – lead vocals (5, 10)
 Magic Mendez – backing vocals (5, 10), vocal arrangements (5, 10)
 The Whispers – backing vocals (5, 10)
 Bridgette Bryant – vocals (9)
 Lynne Fiddmont – vocals (9)
 Lillian Tynes – vocals (9)
 Harmony Blackwell – additional backing vocals (10)
 Mariah Garrett – additional backing vocals (10)
 Merrily Garrett – additional backing vocals (10)
 Starr Mendez – additional backing vocals (10)

Production 
 Russ Freeman – producer (1-4, 6-9, 11), executive producer (1-4, 6-9, 11), recording (1-4, 6-9, 11), mixing (1-4, 6-9, 11)
 Magic Mendez – producer (5, 10), recording (5, 10), mixing (5, 10)
 AndI Howard – executive producer, production coordinator, manager 
 Nicholas Caldwell – executive producer (5, 10)
 Alan Hirschberg – additional recording (1-4, 6-9, 11)
 Harmony Blackwell – Assistant Engineer Production Coordinator(5, 10)
 Meriah Garrett – assistant engineer (5, 10)
 Doug Sax – mastering 
 Hollis King – art direction, graphic design 
 Robin Lynch – art direction
 Jim Gurney – photography 
 Carl Studna – photography
 Gardner Howard Ringe Entertainment – management company

Studios 
 Tracks 1-4, 6-9 & 11 recorded and mixed at Cheyenne Mountain Ranch Studios (Colorado); Additional recording at Pacifique Recorders and Alpha Studios (Burbank, California).
 Tracks 5 & 10 recorded and mixed at Magic Muzik Studios (Moorpark, California).
 Mastered at The Mastering Lab (Hollywood, California).

Charts

References

External links
The Rippingtons-Brave New World at Discogs
The Rippingtons-Brave New World at AllMusic
The Rippingtons official website

1996 albums
GRP Records albums
The Rippingtons albums